Yevgeniya Vladimirovna Medvedeva (born 4 July 1976 in Kondopoga, Karelian ASSR) is a Russian cross-country skier who has competed since 1996. Competing in two Winter Olympics, she won two medals at Turin in 2006 with a gold in the 4 × 5 km relay and a bronze in the 7.5 km + 7.5 km double pursuit.

Medvedeva-Arbuzova also won two silver medals at the FIS Nordic World Ski Championships (30 km: 2009, 4 × 5 km relay: 2005).

Cross-country skiing results
All results are sourced from the International Ski Federation (FIS).

Olympic Games
 2 medals – (1 gold, 1 bronze)

World Championships
 2 medals – (2 silver)

World Cup

Season standings

Individual podiums
1 victory – (1 ) 
5 podiums – (4 , 1 )

Team podiums

 2 victories – (1 , 1 )
 5 podiums – (4 , 1 )

References

External links
 

1976 births
Cross-country skiers at the 2006 Winter Olympics
Cross-country skiers at the 2010 Winter Olympics
Living people
Olympic bronze medalists for Russia
Olympic cross-country skiers of Russia
Olympic gold medalists for Russia
People from Kondopoga
Russian female cross-country skiers
Olympic medalists in cross-country skiing
FIS Nordic World Ski Championships medalists in cross-country skiing
Medalists at the 2006 Winter Olympics
Sportspeople from the Republic of Karelia

Deputies of the Legislative Assembly of the Republic of Karelia